Susan F. Hirsch is a legal anthropologist whose work has specialized in the study of legal language.  She is a professor of conflict resolution and anthropology at George Mason University.  Her first book, Pronouncing and Persevering, focused on men's and women's language in coastal Kenyan courts.  She demonstrated how women's language in court was influencing social change there, because the courts allowed prototypical women's stories to be heard in a new way.  She uses detailed language analysis to show this, drawing on linguistic anthropology.  Her second book In Moment of Greatest Calamity, uses linguistic anthropological analysis but also first-person experience to describe her experience as the widow of a victim of the bombing of the U.S. embassy in Tanzania—and as a participant and observer of the subsequent trial of the suspected bombers.  She has served as editor of the Political and Legal Anthropology Review and as president of the Association for Political and Legal Anthropology.

References

External links
Susan Hirsch's George Mason University home page

Living people
American anthropologists
American women anthropologists
George Mason University faculty
Year of birth missing (living people)
American women academics
21st-century American women